Compsolechia blepharopa is a moth of the family Gelechiidae. It was described by Edward Meyrick in 1914. It is found in Guyana.

The wingspan is 12–14 mm. The forewings are blackish with lilac-grey markings, sometimes slightly whitish sprinkled, more or less marked with white on the costa. There is a narrow oblique subbasal fascia and moderate antemedian and postmedian fasciae converging towards the dorsum and confluent on the lower third, the second marked with a rather large round blackish spot outlined with white representing the second discal stigma. A patch of white irroration or suffusion is found on the apical portion of the costa and there is a separate semicircular patch of whitish irroration on the termen, which is more or less indicated, sometimes nearly obsolete. The hindwings are dark fuscous.

References

Moths described in 1914
Compsolechia
Taxa named by Edward Meyrick